Kaval Sviri is a Bulgarian folk song.

Lyrics

Popular versions 
A popular version was arranged by Petar Lyondev and performed by Ensemble Trakia on the Grammy Award-winning album Le Mystère des Voix Bulgares, Vol. II (album), released in 1987 by Disques Cellier in Switzerland.

"Kaval Sviri" was recorded by Australian world music ensemble Balkan Ethno Orchestra, and features on their 2020 EP Zora.

Use as a sample and in popular culture 
The song is a somewhat commonly used sample in modern pop and rap music as the following examples illustrate:

 Stahlhammer (1997) - Stahlingrad
 Jason Derulo (2011) - Breathing
 S. Castro (2013) - Krieger II (German)
 Kollegah (2014) - Königsaura
 Stan Kolev & Aaron Suiss (2020) - Anomalous (Original Mix)
 M.I.A. (2020) - OHMNI W202091 
 SL (rapper) & M1llionz - Versus (2021) 
The song was used by composer Joseph LoDuca as the basis for Xena's fight theme in Xena: Warrior Princess, although the vocals that appear in the show's opening sequence sing different lyrics.

The song was used to promote Lady Gaga's 2017 documentary "Five Foot Two".

References

Bulgarian folk songs